Kajiura (written: 梶浦) is a Japanese surname. Notable people with the surname include:

, Japanese singer
, Japanese shogi player
Jason Kajiura, Canadian middle-distance runner and physiologist
, Japanese composer and music producer

Japanese-language surnames